Wallingwells Priory was a small house of Benedictine nuns founded in the 1140s by Ralph de Chevrolcourt at Wallingwells on land he had donated near Carlton in Lindrick, Nottinghamshire.

The priory was surrendered to the Crown as part of the Dissolution of the Monasteries on 14 December 1539, after which a pension of £6 was assigned to Margaret Goldsmith the last prioress, and of 53s. 4d. each to Anne Roden the sub-prioress and Elizabeth Kirkby and of 40s. each to the six other nuns.

At its dissolution, The Priory was valued at £59 (equivalent to £ in ),and was granted by Queen Elizabeth I to Richard Pype and Francis Bowyer; it was later the property of the Taylor and White families. A country house known as Wallingwells Hall was built on the site using materials retrieved from the priory.

Prioresses of Wallingwells
 Margery Dourant (temp Richard I)
 Emma de Stockwell, appointed November 1295 by Archbishop Romayne  
 Dionysia, resigned 1325  
 Alice de Sheffield, resigned 1353 
 Helen de Bolsover, resigned 1402 
 Isabel de Durham, 1402  
 Joan Hewet, died 1465 
 Elizabeth Wilcocks, 1465  
 Elizabeth Kirkby, 1504 
 Isabel Croft, 1508–11 
 Anne Goldsmith, 1516 
 Margaret Goldsmith, 1521

References

 

Monasteries in Nottinghamshire
Benedictine nunneries in England
1539 disestablishments in England
Religious organizations established in the 1140s
Christian monasteries established in the 12th century
1140s establishments in England